Duncan Fletcher McCuaig (August 26, 1889 – August 17, 1950) was a Canadian politician who served in the House of Commons from 1935 to 1945, representing the electoral district of Simcoe North as a member of the Liberal Party. He had previously served as mayor of Barrie, Ontario from 1928 to 1931.

His daughter Janice later served for twelve years as mayor of Barrie, and herself mounted an unsuccessful campaign for election to the House of Commons in 1993.

External links
 

1889 births
1950 deaths
Liberal Party of Canada MPs
Members of the House of Commons of Canada from Ontario
Mayors of Barrie